Haustellotyphis is a genus of sea snails, marine gastropod mollusks in the family Muricidae, the murex snails or rock snails.  It was described by Félix Pierre Jousseaume in 1880.

Species
Species within the genus Haustellotyphis include:

 Haustellotyphis cumingii (Broderip, 1833)
 Haustellotyphis wendita Hertz, 1995

References

 
Gastropod genera
Gastropods described in 1880
Taxa named by Félix Pierre Jousseaume